Abdallahi Mohamed Mahmoud (born 4 May 2000) is a Mauritanian professional footballer who plays for Spanish club Deportivo Alavés and the Mauritania national team as either a central defender or a midfielder.

Club career
Born in Dar-Naim, Mahmoud started his career with FC Nouadhibou, first playing for their main squad in 2017. On 8 August 2018, after impressing with the under-20 national team in the L'Alcúdia International Football Tournament, he signed for La Liga side Deportivo Alavés, being initially assigned to the youth setup.

Midway through the 2018–19 season, Mahmoud started to appear with the reserves in Tercera División, and contributed with one goal in 12 appearances (play-offs included) as his side achieved promotion to Segunda División B. On 11 May 2020, he was one of the five B-team players called up to train with the main squad for the remainder of the campaign after the COVID-19 pandemic.

Mahmoud made his first team – and La Liga – debut on 27 June 2020, starting in a 1–2 loss at Atlético Madrid. On 18 August of the following year, moved on loan to Croatian club NK Istra 1961, for one year.

International career
After representing Mauritania at under-20 level in the 2018 COTIF tournament, Mahmoud was first called up for the full side on 27 August 2018, for a 2019 Africa Cup of Nations qualification match against Burkina Faso. He made his international debut on 8 September, coming on as a late substitute for Abdoulaye Gaye in the 2–0 win.

Career statistics

Club

International

International goals 
Scores and results list Mauritania's goal tally first, score column indicates score after each Mahmoud goal.

References

External links

2000 births
Living people
Mauritanian footballers
Association football central defenders
FC Nouadhibou players
La Liga players
Segunda División B players
Tercera División players
Deportivo Alavés B players
Deportivo Alavés players
Mauritania international footballers
Mauritanian expatriate footballers
Mauritanian expatriate sportspeople in Spain
Expatriate footballers in Spain
Association football midfielders
NK Istra 1961 players
Mauritanian expatriate sportspeople in Croatia
Expatriate footballers in Croatia
Croatian Football League players
2021 Africa Cup of Nations players